Methyl fluorosulfonate, also known as magic methyl, is the organic compound with the formula FSO2OCH3. It is a colorless liquid that is used as a strong methylating agent in organic synthesis.  Because of its extreme toxicity, it has largely been replaced by the related reagent methyl trifluoromethanesulfonate.

Synthesis and reactions
It is prepared by distillation of an equimolar mixture of fluorosulfonic acid and dimethyl sulfate.  It was originally produced by the reaction of methanol with fluorosulfonic acid.

Methyl fluorosulfonate is a highly electrophilic reagent for methylation.  It is ranked as less powerful than methyl trifluoromethanesulfonate.

Toxicity
Similar to phosgene, it is acutely toxic by inhalation, with an LC50 (rat, 1 hour) of about 5 ppm. Several cases of poisoning resulting in death from pulmonary edema have been reported.

References

Methylating agents
Methyl esters
Sulfonate esters